Robertdollfusiidae is a family of nematodes belonging to the order Muspiceida.

Genera:
 Durikainema Spratt & Speare, 1982
 Haycocknema Spratt, Beveridge, Andrews & Dennett, 1999
 Lappnema Bain & Nikander, 1983
 Robertdollfusa Chabaud & Campana, 1950

References

Enoplea
Nematode families